Jonathon Merrill (born February 3, 1992) is an American professional ice hockey defenseman for the Minnesota Wild of the National Hockey League (NHL). Merrill was selected by the New Jersey Devils in the 2nd round (38th overall) of the 2010 NHL Entry Draft. Merrill was born in Oklahoma City, Oklahoma, but grew up in Grand Blanc, Michigan and Brighton, Michigan.

Playing career
As a youth, Merrill played in the 2004 Quebec International Pee-Wee Hockey Tournament with the Detroit Little Caesars minor ice hockey team.

Prior to turning professional, Merrill played NCAA college hockey with the Michigan Wolverines men's ice hockey team. 
Merrill was suspended for the first 12 games of the 2011–12 season by the University of Michigan for "violating team rules."

On March 27, 2013, the New Jersey Devils signed Merrill to a three-year entry-level contract, and he began the 2013–14 season in the American Hockey League (AHL) with the Albany Devils.

In the 2013–14 season, Merrill made his NHL debut on November 3, 2013, skating with the Devils in a game against the Minnesota Wild at Xcel Energy Center, but less than five minutes into he game he fell into the boards,  sustaining severe facial lacerations and a concussion.

He scored his first NHL goal on February 7, 2014, a game winner in overtime against Ilya Bryzgalov of the Edmonton Oilers, making him the first Devil to score his first NHL goal in overtime.

On June 21, 2017, Merrill was selected in the NHL Expansion Draft by the Vegas Golden Knights. On January 16, 2018, Merrill signed a two-year, $2.75 million contract extension with the Golden Knights. 

After three seasons as an original member of the Golden Knights, Merrill left the club as a free agent and was signed to a one-year, $925,000 contract with the Detroit Red Wings on October 9, 2020. In the shortened  season, Merrill registered 5 assists in 36 games from the blueline for the Red Wings before he was dealt at the trade deadline to the Montreal Canadiens in exchange for Hayden Verbeek and a fifth-round pick in the 2021 NHL Entry Draft on April 11, 2021. 

Merrill made 13 further regular season appearances with the Canadiens, going scoreless, before featuring in 13 playoff games in helping Montreal reach the 2021 Stanley Cup Finals before falling to the Tampa Bay Lightning.

As a free agent from the Canadiens, Merrill joined his fifth NHL organization in agreeing to terms with the Minnesota Wild on a one-year, $850,000 contract on July 29, 2021.

On January 11 2022, Merrill was signed to a three-year, $3.6 million extension with the Wild.

Career statistics

Regular season and playoffs

International

Awards and honors

References

External links
 

1992 births
Living people
Albany Devils players
American men's ice hockey defensemen
Detroit Red Wings players
Ice hockey players from Michigan
Ice hockey people from Oklahoma
Michigan Wolverines men's ice hockey players
Minnesota Wild players
Montreal Canadiens players
New Jersey Devils draft picks
New Jersey Devils players
People from Brighton, Michigan
Sportspeople from Metro Detroit
Sportspeople from Oklahoma City
Vegas Golden Knights players